The 1878 Amherst football team was an American football team that represented Amherst College during the 1878 college football season. The team compiled a record of 1–2–1.

Schedule

References

Amherst
Amherst Mammoths football seasons
Amherst football